Baba Thakur is a temple dedicated to Krishna in Karoli village of Kosli tehsil of Rewari district in Haryana state of India. "Thakur" is another name of Krishna.

There was an old temple building on the site which the villagers began to renovate in 1997, a project that took two years.

Gallery

Holi 2014

See also

 Karoli, Rewari
 Yaduvanshi Ahirs
 Lookhi
 Kosli
 Kanina khas
 Rewari
 Mahendragarh
 Yadav caste

References

Hindu temples in Haryana
Krishna temples
Rewari district